Raghunath Vishnu Pandit (1916 or 1917-1990) was a Goan poet. He is best known and most celebrated for his vast poetic production in Konkani. Pandit also produced a significant body of work in Portuguese after the Liberation of Goa in 1961, and also wrote in Marathi. Much of his output was written in a neo-realist style demonstrating a marked concern for the downtrodden sections of Goan society. Among his most noted achievements are the publication of five books of poetry on one day (26 January 1963) and a prize from the Sahitya Akademi for his 1975 Dariā Gāzotā.

A monograph on Poet Raghunath Vishnu Pandit has been written by Dr. S. M. Tadkodkar, a Konkani-Marathi poet, research scholar and Reader, Head of Department of Marathi Goa University. It was published by Goa Government's Goa Konkani Akademy, in 2006.

External links 
 Article about R.V. Pandit by Alfredo Bragança (in Portuguese)

Examples of his poetry in Portuguese may be found here:
 O Inverno (1969)
 Aquelas Mulheres (1969)
 Para quê (1969)
 A Chuva (1968)
 Cada Gota do Teu Sangue (1968)
 Mãos em toda a parte (1968)
 A Folha do Tamarindeiro (1968)
 A Mão Não Abarca (1968)
 Sem Amparo (1968)
 Vinho (1968)
 Sem Desejo (1959/1968)
 A Minha Mente Quadrada (1968)
 À espera de Rama (1959/1967)
 A Palha (1965)
 Mar de Embriaguez (1965
 A Virtude Peregrina (1963)
 A Lua (1963)
 Casa, Minha Casa! (1963)
 A Chuva (1962)
 Espiga (1962)
 As Paredes Têm Ouvidos (1962)

References 

Indian male poets
Portuguese-language writers
Poets from Goa
Recipients of the Sahitya Akademi Award in Konkani
Konkani-language poets
Recipients of the Padma Shri in literature & education
20th-century Indian poets
20th-century Indian male writers
Producers who won the Best Popular Film Providing Wholesome Entertainment National Film Award